Benito José Baranda Ferrán (born 1 January 1959) is a Chilean psychologist who is a member of the Chilean Constitutional Convention.

References

External links
 

Living people
1959 births
Chilean psychologists
21st-century Chilean politicians
Members of the Chilean Constitutional Convention
Pontifical Catholic University of Chile alumni
Pontifical Lateran University alumni
People from Santiago
Non-Neutral Independents politicians